Hart-Davis is a surname. Notable people with the surname include:

 Adam Hart-Davis (born 1943), English scientist, author, photographer, historian and broadcaster
 Alice Hart-Davis (born 1963), British journalist and author
 Deirdre Hart-Davis (1909–1999), English socialite
 Duff Hart-Davis (born 1936), British biographer, naturalist and journalist
 Jack Hart-Davis (1900–1963), South African cricket umpire
 Rupert Hart-Davis (1907–1999), British publisher, literary editor, and man of letters

Others 
 Hart Davis (1791–1854), British politician, MP for Colchester 1812–18
 Hart-Davis, MacGibbon, British publishing house
 Lyttelton/Hart-Davis Letters, Rupert Hart-Davis' published volumes of correspondence with George William Lyttelton
 William Hart Davis, pen name of Bill Pronzini (born 1943), American writer
 William Watts Hart Davis (1820–1910), American brigadier general

See also 
 Hart (surname)
 Davis (surname)
 
Compound surnames
English-language surnames
Surnames of English origin